Actenobius magneoculus is an extinct species of anobiid beetle in the family Anobiidae.

References

Anobiidae
Articles created by Qbugbot
Beetles described in 2015